William D. Waugh  (born December 1, 1929) is a former United States Army Special Forces soldier and Central Intelligence Agency paramilitary operations officer who served more than 50 years between the U.S. Army's Green Berets and the CIA's Special Activities Division.

Early life
Waugh was born in Bastrop, Texas, on December 1, 1929. In 1945, upon meeting two local Marines who returned from the fighting in World War II, the then 15-year-old Waugh was inspired to enlist in the Marine Corps. Knowing that it was unlikely that he would be admitted in Texas because of his young age, Waugh devised a plan to hitchhike to Los Angeles, where he believed a person had to only be 16 to enlist. He got as far as Las Cruces, New Mexico, before he was arrested for having no identification and refusing to give his name to a local police officer. He was later released after securing enough money for a bus ticket back to Bastrop. Now committed to serving in the military once he finished school, Waugh became an excellent student at Bastrop High School, graduating in 1947 with a 4.0 grade point average.

Military career
Waugh enlisted in the U.S. Army in 1948, completing basic training at Fort Ord, California, in August of that year. He was accepted into the United States Army Airborne School and became airborne qualified in December 1948. In April 1951, Waugh was assigned to the 187th Airborne Regimental Combat Team (RCT) in Korea.

Special Forces
Shortly after the end of the Korean War, Waugh met two U.S. Army Special Forces members on a train in Germany, they informed him of openings for Platoon sergeants, shortly after he requested a transfer. He began training for the Special Forces, and earned the Green Beret in 1954, joining the 10th Special Forces Group (SFG) in Bad Tölz, West Germany.

As U.S. involvement in the Vietnam War increased, the United States began deploying Special Forces "A-teams" (Operational Detachment Alpha, or ODA, teams) to Southeast Asia in support of counterinsurgency operations against the Viet Cong (VC), North Vietnamese and other Communist forces. Waugh arrived in South Vietnam with his ODA in 1961, and began working alongside Civilian Irregular Defense Groups (CIDGs) there, as well as in Laos.

In July 1965, he was serving with 5th Special Forces Group A-team A-321 at Camp Bồng Sơn, Bình Định Province, commanded by Captain Paris Davis. Following a night raid with a Regional Forces unit on a VC encampment near Bong Son, the unit was engaged by a superior VC force. Many of the Regional Forces soldiers refused to fight and most of the A team were injured by VC fire, including Waugh who was shot multiple times and left between the VC and U.S./South Vietnamese forces. Waugh was later rescued by Davis under fire. He spent much of 1965 and 1966 recuperating at Walter Reed Hospital in Washington, D.C., eventually returning to duty with 5th Special Forces Group in 1966. He received a Silver Star and a Purple Heart (his 6th) for the battle at Bong Son.

At this time Waugh joined the Military Assistance Command-Vietnam Studies and Observations Group (MACV-SOG). While working for SOG, Waugh helped train Vietnamese and Cambodian forces in unconventional warfare tactics primarily directed against the North Vietnamese Army operating along the Ho Chi Minh Trail.

Prior to retirement from U.S. Army Special Forces service, Waugh was senior NCO (non-commissioned officer) of MACV-SOG's Command & Control North (CCN) based at Marble Mountain on the South China Sea shore a few miles south of Da Nang, Vietnam. Waugh held this Command Sergeant Major role during the covert unit's transition and name change to Task Force One Advisory Element (TF1AE). SGM Waugh conducted the first combat High Altitude, Low Opening (HALO) jump, a parachuting maneuver designed for rapid, undetected insertion into hostile territory. In October 1970, his team made a practice Combat Infiltration into the NVA owned War Zone D, in South Vietnam, for reassembly training, etc. Waugh also led the last combat Special reconnaissance parachute insertion by American Army Special Forces HALO parachutists into denied territory which was occupied by communist North Vietnamese Army (NVA) troops on June 22, 1971.

Waugh retired from active military duty at the rank of Sergeant Major (E-9) on February 1, 1972.

CIA career
After Waugh retired from the military, he worked for the United States Postal Service until he accepted an offer in 1977 from ex-CIA officer Edwin P. Wilson to work in Libya on a contract to train that country's special forces. This was not an Agency-endorsed assignment and Waugh might have found himself in trouble with U.S. authorities if it weren't for the fact that he was also approached by the CIA to work for the Agency while in Libya. The CIA tasked him with surveilling Libyan military installations and capabilities – this was of great interest to U.S. intelligence as Libya was receiving substantial military assistance from the Soviet Union at the time. Edwin P. Wilson was later indicted and convicted in 1979 for illegally selling weapons to Libya.

In the 1980s he was assigned to the Kwajalein Missile Range in the Marshall Islands to track Soviet small boat teams (Naval Spetsnaz: Dolfin) operating in the area and prevent them from stealing U.S. missile technology. Some of his more critical assignments took place in Khartoum, Sudan during the early 1990s, where he performed surveillance and intelligence gathering on terrorist leaders Carlos the Jackal and Osama bin Laden with Cofer Black.

At the age of 71, Waugh participated in Operation Enduring Freedom from October to December 2001 as a member of the CIA's Northern Alliance Liaison Team led by Gary Schroen which went into Afghanistan to work with the Northern Alliance to topple the Taliban regime and Al Qaeda at the Battle of Tora Bora.

It is unknown how many missions Waugh was involved in during his career.

Education

In 1985, Waugh was again requested by the CIA for clandestine work. Before he took the offer, he decided to further his education, earning bachelor's degrees in Business and Police Science from Wayland Baptist University in 1987. He also earned a master's degree in Interdisciplinary Studies with a specialization in criminal justice administration (MSCJA) in 1988 from Texas State University (formerly Southwest Texas State), in San Marcos, Texas.

Publications
 
 
 Confronting Iran: Securing Iraq's Border: An Irregular Warfare Concept, A Small Wars Journal collaboration with Brig. Gen. David L. Grange (USA, ret.), Scott Swanson (military) (AKA J.T. Patten, Author), Maj. Gen. John K. Singlaub (USA, ret.) and Billy Waugh, November 10, 2007.

Awards and decorations (partial list)

See also

Studies and Observations Group

Further reading 
Licensed to Kill, Hired Guns in the War on Terror by Robert Young Pelton. In the book Pelton details his meeting with Waugh to discuss Billy's link between watching Osama Bin Laden in Khartoum to chasing him in Afghanistan. Billy details his time with the Special Activity Division as a contractor.

References

External links
Waugh's biography SITE DOWN
Billy Waugh's website with information about his memoir Hunting the Jackal SITE DOWN
Hunting the Jackal: A Special Forces and CIA Soldier's Fifty Years on the Frontlines of the War Against Terrorism 2004
Green Berets outfought, outthought the Taliban USA Today January 6, 2002

1929 births
Living people
United States Army personnel of the Vietnam War
United States Army personnel of the Korean War
American spies
Members of the United States Army Special Forces
People from Bastrop, Texas
Recipients of the Silver Star
People of the Central Intelligence Agency
United States Army soldiers
Recipients of the Air Medal
Recipients of the Legion of Merit